John Russell (died 1437) was an English landowner and Justice of the Peace who was elected Speaker of the House of Commons of England in 1423 and 1432.

Russell sat in the Parliaments of 1410, 1411 and 1417 as a proxy for the Abbot of Gloucester; and also in later parliaments between 1414 and 1433 having been elected to the House of Commons as knight of the shire for Herefordshire in his own right. He was appointed High Sheriff of Herefordshire in 1417. He made an unsuccessful attempt to become speaker in 1420 losing to Roger Hunt, but was elected to the role in 1423.

Russell gave the speech of welcome at the infant Henry VI's first appearance before the assembled House of Commons and House of Lords on 17 November 1423.

He was again elected as Speaker in 1432.

References

History of Parliament RUSSELL, John (d. 1437) of Herefs

Year of birth missing
14th-century births
1437 deaths
High Sheriffs of Herefordshire
Speakers of the House of Commons of England
English MPs 1410
English MPs 1411
English landowners
English MPs 1417
English MPs April 1414
English MPs 1420
English MPs 1423
English MPs 1433
English MPs 1419
English MPs May 1421
English MPs December 1421
English MPs 1422
English MPs 1426
English MPs 1429
English MPs 1431
English MPs 1432